Ayr Academy (Scottish Gaelic: Acadamaidh Inbhir Àir) is a non-denominational secondary school situated within the Craigie Estate area at University Avenue in Ayr, South Ayrshire. It is a comprehensive school for children of ages 11–18 from Ayr. Ayr Academy's catchment area covers Newton-on-Ayr, Whitletts and the outlying villages of Coylton, Annbank, and Mossblown.

In 2007, the closure of Mainholm Academy resulted in the addition of approximately 100 pupils attending Ayr Academy. As of November 2020, 572 pupils attended Ayr Academy which is the smallest pupil intake numbers in the whole of South Ayrshire.

Overview

Catchment area
In economical terms, Ayr Academy is one of the schools within South Ayrshire with high levels of economic deprivation and disadvantage, with more pupils attending Ayr Academy from deprived backgrounds than most within South Ayrshire. This was highlighted nationally in 2015 upon the release of national examination results across Scotland, with Ayr Academy's performance in the national examinations being the worst in South Ayrshire – Director of Education for South Ayrshire Council, Douglas Hutchinson, claiming that "Research shows that young people who are less economically advantaged achieve less well across Scotland. Therefore, to compare schools that may experience greater levels of deprivation does not reflect the hard work by staff and young people".

Pupils who attend Ayr Academy reside in areas that are north of Ayr, including neighbourhoods such as Whitletts and Dalmilling as well as former coal mining villages. Comparing this to nearby Kyle Academy where pupils reside in more affluent areas of Ayr such Park Circus and Bellevue Crescent, the examination results for Kyle Academy was the best for the South Ayrshire area in comparison to Ayr Academy performing the worst.

History

The school has existed, in various guises, since 1233 although it did not come to be known as Ayr Academy until 1796. It moved from the Sandgate to its location on Fort Street in 1800, with a further extension to the building added in the 1930s where it remained until the new school was built within Craigie and the Fort Street building closed in 2017.

After the Reformation the school was taken over by the council of the Royal Burgh of Ayr, the school moved to its former site on Fort Street in Ayr town centre site in 1602. In 1794 a Royal Charter converted the school into Ayr Academy. Ayr Academy's coat of arms was awarded in 1912 and bears the school motto Respice Prospice which means look backwards, look forward.

New build

In November 2016, following a decision made at a leadership panel of South Ayrshire Council, it was decided by councillors and South Ayrshire Council's Director of Education, Douglas Hutchinson, that for the first time since its establishment, Ayr Academy would not have a sole Head Teacher leading the schools staff, pupils and curriculum. Rather, a controversial decision was made to share a Head Teacher with nearby secondary school Kyle Academy. The controversial decision was met with harsh reactions from parents and carers of children attending both Ayr and Kyle Academies, with many speculating that in the future that both schools would merge to save money – a rumour South Ayrshire Council has since denied.

Ayr Academy's Fort Street site had fallen into a state of disrepair, leading South Ayrshire Council to put forward proposals to construct a new build at University Avenue on the Craigie estate in Ayr, costing £25 million to create the Ayr Academy Learning Campus. Construction for the new school commenced in January 2016, with the new school opening to staff and pupils in August 2017. The new Ayr Academy build has the capacity for up to 1,000 pupils and will include two unique ‘learning plazas’ – open spaces that can be used to bring together multiple classes for collaborative learning and discussions.

The project was delivered by Hub South West, created in conjunction with SFT and other partner organisations to deliver major public sector building projects. Construction work was undertaken by Kier Construction.

The new school was built within Craigie and the handover to South Ayrshire Council was completed on 4 August 2017 for the start of term on 18 August 2017. The old Ayr Academy closed for the final time to pupils on 23 June 2017 and to staff on 28 June 2017.

Shared Head Teacher (2016–2018)

On 1 November 2016, South Ayrshire Council Leadership Panel approved to pilot a Shared Headship arrangement between Ayr Academy and Kyle Academy due to a number of factors which had resulted in pupil attainment in national qualifications in National 5 and Higher Qualifications being significantly lower than national comparators. The purpose of the Shared Headship programme was to ensure sharing of practice and standards in order to raise attainment at Ayr Academy. The pilot has proved successful in addressing the areas identified within the November 2016 report to the South Ayrshire Council Leadership Panel. Overall, there has been an increase in attainment at every level within Ayr Academy except for advanced higher; the decline in pupil roll is reversing with less placing requests being made out of Ayr Academy, pupil attendance has improved, along with exclusion numbers declining. Due to greater community and parental engagement, transitions from primary to secondary are more effective and smooth for children; there is greater pupil participation in initiatives such as the Scottish Rugby School and SFA School of Football and project working with Community Learning and Development. Additionally, there has also been a successful move to a new fit for purpose Ayr Academy school building that was completed and opened in August 2017.

The Shared Headship programme was set to run until June 2018, with reports being published in September 2018 by South Ayrshire Council to determine its success. However, in November 2017, it was reported that Lyndsay McRoberts, Executive Head Teacher at Ayr Academy (and Kyle Academy), was appointed to Head Teacher at Duncanrig Secondary School in East Kilbride. This has resulted South Ayrshire making the decision to advertise for both Head Teacher posts at both Ayr and Kyle Academies, despite the Shared Headship trial not yet being completed.

The post of Executive Depute Head Teacher at both Ayr and Kyle Academies will remain in place until June 2018.

Former Rectors/Head Teachers
Dr Jas. B. Ritchie - 1932-1945. 
Mr J.D Cairns - 1945-1965 (Retired)
Mr Neil McCorkindale - 1965-1970 (Left for Perth Academy and retired from Perth in 1986)
Mr W Reid - 1970–1982 (Retired)
Mr B Ballantyne - 1982–1989 - (Left for Kilwinning Academy)
Mr A Moir - 1989–1997 - (Left for Belmont Academy)
Mr David Mathieson - 1997–2010 - (Retired)
Mrs K MacDonald - 2010–2016 - Seconded to County Buildings due to new joint headteacher
Mrs L McRoberts - 2016–2018 (Appointed to post of Head Teacher at Duncanrig Secondary School, East Kilbride)

Notable alumni

 James Morris Gale – Civil Engineer responsible for the extension of supply of water to Glasgow.
 Irvine Parker – first-class cricketer

References

External links
 Ayr Academy
 Ayr Academy's page on Scottish Schools Online
 South Ayrshire Council

Secondary schools in South Ayrshire
Schools in Ayr